Quartodecimanism (from the Vulgate Latin quarta decima in Leviticus 23:5, meaning fourteenth) is the name given to the practice of celebrating the death of Christ on the day of Passover on the 14th of Nisan according to the biblical dating, being on whatever day of the week. The Quartodeciman controversy in the Church was over the question of celebrating Easter on the first day of the week, Sunday, or at the same time as the sacrifice of the Passover lamb.

History

Early Christianity 

There is scholarly disagreement on which tradition is the original, some scholars believe that Sunday observance began before Quartodecimanism, while others have argued that Quartodecimanism was original. The Quartodecimans claimed that their traditions are inherited from the Apostle John and Philip, while western churches claimed that their views of Easter have been inherited from Paul and Peter. Quartodecimanism was mainly popular in Asia Minor, Jerusalem and Syria, however it was rejected by churches in other regions. Polycarp, like other Asiatics, kept Easter on the fourteenth day of the month of Abib/Aviv. According to Eusebius, Polycarp claimed that his practice came from the apostle John. Some of the Montanists were also Quartodeciman preferring to celebrate Easter on the Hebrew calendar date of 14 Nisan, regardless of what day of the week it landed on. Montanism even brought Quartodeciman practices to the west, for example Blastus was a Roman Montanist who was also a Quartodeciman. It is unclear if the Ebionites could be deemed Quartodecimans, however they probably still observed the Passover in addition to other Jewish festivals.

Melito of Sardis, Sagar of Laodicea, Papirius of Smyrna, perhaps Apollonaris of Laodicea and Polycrates of Ephesus had Quartodeciman views. The Didascalia likely drew from a Quartodeciman source. Some Novatians that spread into the east were Quartodecimans.

By the 4th century the influence of Quartodecimans became smaller, later the Quartodecimans would be even persecuted.

The opponents of Quartodecimanism often argued that it is a form of Judaizing.

Roman Schism 
Blastus, a Montanist caused a schism in Rome about the date of Easter, Blastus argued that Christians must keep Easter at the same time commanded in Exodus for the Passover and gained a following in Rome, Blastus was then accused of Judaizing by the Church. This schism in Rome likely influenced the hostility of Pope Victor I against Quartodecimanism.

Quartodeciman controversy 
The Quartodeciman controversy arose because Christians in the churches of Jerusalem and Asia Minor observed Easter on the 14th of the first month (Nisan), no matter the day of the week on which it occurred, while the churches in and around Rome practiced celebrating Easter always on the Sunday following first Full Moon following the vernal equinox, calling it "the day of the resurrection of our Saviour". The difference was turned into an ecclesiastical controversy when the practice was condemned by synods of bishops.

Background 
Of the disputes about the date when the Lord's Supper (Eucharist) should be celebrated, disputes known as Paschal/Easter controversies, the quartodeciman is the first recorded.

In the mid–2nd century, the practice in Asia Minor was for the pre-Paschal fast to end and the feast to be held on the 14th day of Nisan, when the Barley was found ripe after the New Moon near the Jewish lunar month of Nisan (no matter the day of the week on which it occurred), the date on which the Passover sacrifice had been offered when the Second Temple stood, and "the day when the people put away the leaven". Those who observed this practice were called quartodecimani, Latin for "fourteenthers", because of holding their celebration on the 14th day of Nisan.

The practice had been followed by Polycarp, who was a disciple of John the Apostle and bishop of Smyrna (c. 69 – c. 155) - one of the seven churches of Asia, and by Melito of Sardis (d. c. 180). Irenaeus says that Polycarp visited Rome when Anicetus was its bishop (c. 68–153), and among the topics discussed was this divergence of custom, with Rome celebrating the Easter always on Sunday. Irenaeus noted:

But neither considered that the disagreement required them to break off communion and initiate a schism. Indeed, "Anicetus conceded the administration of the Eucharist in the church to Polycarp, manifestly as a mark of respect. And they parted from each other in peace, both those who observed, and those who did not, maintaining the peace of the whole church."

Sozomen also wrote:

A modern source says that the discussion between Polycarp and Anicetus in Rome took place within the framework of a synod.

Thus the churches in Asia appealed to the Apostle John in support of their practice, while Sozomen wrote that the Roman custom (observed, according to Irenaeus, since at least the time of Bishop Xystus of 115–25) was believed to have been handed down by the Apostles Peter and Paul, and Eusebius states that in Palestine and Egypt the Sunday observance was also believed to have originated with the Apostles.

Condemnatory synods
According to Eusebius, in the last decade of the 2nd century a number of synods were convened to deal with the controversy, ruling unanimously that the celebration of Easter should be observed and be exclusively on Sunday.

These synods were held in Palestine, Pontus and Osrhoene in the east, and in Rome and Gaul in the west. The council in Rome, presided over by its bishop Victor, took place in 193 and sent a letter about the matter to Polycrates of Ephesus and the churches of the Roman province of Asia. Within the same year, Polycrates presided over a council at Ephesus attended by several bishops throughout that province, which rejected Victor's authority and kept the province's paschal tradition.

Polycrates emphatically stated that he was following the tradition passed down to him:

Excommunication
On receiving the negative response of Polycrates, Victor attempted to cut off Polycrates and the others who took this stance from the common unity, but reversed his decision after bishops who included Irenaeus, bishop of Lugdunum in Gaul, interceded, recommending that Victor follow the more peaceful attitude of his predecessors.

Resolution
In the short following chapter of the account by Eusebius, a chapter headed "How All came to an Agreement respecting the Passover", he recounts that the Palestinian bishops Narcissus and Theophilus, together with the bishops of Tyre and Ptolemais, wrote a lengthy review of the tradition of Sunday celebration of Easter which believed "had come to them in succession from the apostles", and concluded by saying:

Historically, there had been a debate about when quartodecimanism disappeared and in particular whether it disappeared before or after the first ecumenical council (Nicaea I) in 325. According to Mark DelCogliano, "the older opinion persists" but Duchesne's opinion "has gained widespread acceptance." According to DelCogliano, "by the early 4th century all Christians were celebrating Easter on a Sunday. Accordingly, it was not the quartodeciman practice that Constantine sought to eliminate, but rather the so-called 'Protopaschite' practice which calculated the paschal full moon according to the Jewish lunar calendar and not the Julian solar calendar".

As shown, for instance, by the Sardica paschal table, it was quite common at that time that the Jewish calendrical year started before and after the equinox according to Exodus 12:2 and Deuteronomy 16:1  In case the previous year had started after the equinox, two Passovers would be celebrated in the same solar year (the solar New Year was starting on March 21). But the Ancient Hebrew calendar is based on the New Moon and the Aviv barley, not the Solar calendar. Note: (The word month being Hebrew Chodesh which literally means New Moon which is referenced in Deuteronomy 16:1). Since the 3rd century this disorder of the Jewish calendar of the time was lamented by several Christian writers, who felt that the Jews were often using a wrong lunation as their Nisan month and advocated the introduction of an independent computus by the Christians.

In a letter to the bishops who had not been present, Emperor Constantine I said that it had been decided to adopt a uniform date, rejecting the custom of the Jews, who had crucified Jesus and whose practice often meant that two passovers were celebrated in the same solar year: (Even though there is a commandment to keep a second passover in Numbers 9:10-12 if found unclean to keep the first)

Legacy
It is not known how long the Nisan 14 practice lasted. The church historian Socrates of Constantinople knew of quartodecimans who were deprived of their churches by John Chrysostom, and harassed in unspecified ways by Nestorius, both bishops of Constantinople.  This indicates that the Nisan 14 practice, or a practice that was called by the same name, lingered into the 4th century.

Because this was the first-recorded Paschal/Easter controversy, it has had a strong influence on the minds of some subsequent generations. Wilfrid, the 7th-century bishop of York in Northumbria, styled his opponents in the Paschal/Easter controversy of his day "quartodecimans", though they celebrated Pascha (Easter) on Sunday. Many scholars of the 19th and 20th centuries thought that the dispute over Pascha (Easter) that was discussed at Nicaea was between the Nisan 14 practice and Sunday observance. According to one account, "A final settlement of the dispute was one among the other reasons which led Constantine to summon the council at Nicaea in 325. At that time, the Syrians and Antiochenes were the solitary champions of the observance of the 14th day. The decision of the council was unanimous that Pascha (Easter) was to be kept on Sunday, and on the same Sunday throughout the world, and that 'none hereafter should follow the blindness of the Jews. A new translation, published in 1999, of Eusebius' Life of Constantine suggests that this view is no longer widely accepted; its view is that the dispute at Nicaea was between two schools of Sunday observance: those who followed the traditional practice of relying on Jewish informants to determine the lunar month of the Nisan in which Passover would fall, and those who wished to set it using Christian computations using the spring equinox on the solar calendar. Laurent Cleenewerck suggests that the East-West schism could even be argued to have started with Victor's attempt to excommunicate the Asian churches. Despite Victor's failure to carry out his intent to excommunicate the Asian churches, many Catholic theologians point to this episode as evidence of papal primacy and authority in the early Church, citing the fact that none of the bishops challenged his right to excommunicate but rather questioned the wisdom and charity of doing so. From the Orthodox perspective, Victor had to relent in the end and we see that the Eastern Churches never grant him presidency over anything other than his own church, his own synod.  Cleenewerck points out that Eusebius of Caesarea simply refers to Victor as one of the "rulers of the Churches", not the ruler of a yet unknown or unformed "universal Church". As the date of observance of the Resurrection of Christ as being on the Sunday day of the week rather than the 14th day of the month was not resolved by Papal authority it was only finally resolved by an Ecumenical Council. Epiphanus even called Quartodecimanism a heresy.

The rejection of Bishop Anicetus' position on the quartodeciman by Polycarp, and later Polycrates' letter to Pope Victor I, has been used by Orthodox theologians as proof against the argument that the Churches in Asia Minor accepted the Primacy of the Bishop of Rome and or the teaching of Papal supremacy.

Jehovah's Witnesses and Bible Students worldwide celebrate the Memorial of Christ's death on Nisan 14.

The Living Church of God keeps the quartodeciman Passover on the evening beginning Nisan 14.

See also
 Anti-Judaism
 Celtic Christianity
 Celtic Rite
 Christian Torah-submission
 Christian views on the Old Covenant
 Easter controversy
 Expounding of the Law
 New Covenant
 Paschal mystery
 Peri Pascha
 Supersessionism

Notes

References

Citations

Sources

Further reading

External links

 .
 .

Ancient Christian controversies
Christian terminology
Early Christianity and Judaism
Easter date
Judeo-Christian topics
Mosaic law in Christian theology
Schisms in Christianity
Vulgate Latin words and phrases